The 2003 BellSouth Open was a men's tennis tournament played on outdoor clay courts in Viña del Mar in Chile and was part of the International Series of the 2003 ATP Tour. It was the tenth edition of the tournament and ran from 10 February through 16 February 2003. Unseeded David Sánchez won the singles title.

Finals

Singles

 David Sánchez defeated  Marcelo Ríos 1–6, 6–3, 6–3
 It was Sánchez's 1st singles title of his career.

Doubles

 Agustín Calleri /  Mariano Hood defeated  František Čermák /  Leoš Friedl 6–3, 1–6, 6–4
 It was Calleri's 1st title of the year and the 1st of his career. It was Hood's 1st title of the year and the 5th of his career.

References

External links
 Official website 
 ATP tournament profile

BellSouth Open
Chile Open (tennis)
BellSouth Open